
Carl Püchler (13 May 1894 – 5 February 1949) was a German general during World War II.   He was a recipient of the Knight's Cross of the Iron Cross of Nazi Germany.

Awards and decorations

 Knight's Cross of the Iron Cross on 20 December 1941 as Oberst and commander of Infanterie-Regiment 228

References

Citations

Bibliography

 

1894 births
1949 deaths
German Army generals of World War II
Generals of Infantry (Wehrmacht)
German Army personnel of World War I
Prussian Army personnel
Recipients of the clasp to the Iron Cross, 1st class
Recipients of the Gold German Cross
Recipients of the Knight's Cross of the Iron Cross
German prisoners of war in World War II held by the United States
People from Jelenia Góra
People from the Province of Silesia
Reichswehr personnel